Cordillera de Apaneca is a volcanic mountain range in western El Salvador. It consists mainly of volcanoes. Ilamatepec volcano, one of the most active in the region, is a part of this range.

The volcanoes in the range Santa Ana Volcano, Izalco Volcano, and Cerro Verde were the inspiration for the two active and one dormant volcanoes in Antoine de Saint-Exupéry's novella The Little Prince, based on his life with his Salvadoran wife  Consuelo de Saint Exupéry, who was The Rose in the story.

See also
List of volcanoes in El Salvador

References 
 

Cordillera de Apaneca
Cordillera de Apaneca
Apaneca